The Roman Catholic Archdiocese of Guadalajara is a Roman Catholic archdiocese based in the Mexican city of Guadalajara, Jalisco. It currently covers an area of 20,827 km² (8,044 Square Miles).  The diocese was erected on July 13, 1548 and was elevated to Archdiocese on January 26, 1863.

The Archdiocese of Guadalajara is the Metropolitan see of the suffragan sees of Aguascalientes, Autlán, Ciudad Guzmán, Colima, Jesús Maria del Nayar (a Territorial Prelature), San Juan de los Lagos and Tepic.

On Thursday, July 19, 2012, Pope Benedict XVI accepted the resignation of Francisco Martínez Sáinz, Auxiliary Bishop of the Roman Catholic Archdiocese of Guadalajara and Titular Bishop of Dura, in accordance with Canons 411 and 401.1 of the Code of Canon Law.

Bishops

Ordinaries

Diocese of Guadalajara
Erected: 13 July 1548
Pedro Gómez Malaver (Maraver) (13 Jul 1548 – 28 Dec 1551 Died)
Antonius de Ciudad Rodrigo, O.F.M. (1552 – 13 Sep 1553 Died)
Pedro de Ayala (bishop), O.F.M. (18 Dec 1561 – 19 Sep 1569 Died)
Francisco Gómez de Mendiola y Solórzano (19 Apr 1574 – 23 Apr 1576 Died)
Domingo de Alzola, O.P. (1 Oct 1582 – 15 Feb 1590 Died)
Pedro Suarez de Escobar, O.S.A. (1591 Died Bishop-elect)
Francisco Santos García de Ontiveros y Martínez (22 May 1592 – 28 Jun 1596 Died)
Alfonso de la Mota y Escobar (11 Mar 1598 – 12 Feb 1607 Appointed, Bishop of Tlaxcala (Puebla de los Ángeles)
Juan de Valle y Arredondo, O.S.B. (19 Mar 1607 – 1617 Resigned).
Francisco de Rivera y Pareja, O. de M. (29 Jan 1618 – 17 Sep 1629 Appointed, Bishop of Michoacán)
Leonel de Cervantes y Caravajal (17 Dec 1629 – 18 Feb 1636 Appointed, Bishop of Antequera, Oaxaca)
Juan Sánchez Duque de Estrada (21 Jul 1636 – 12 Nov 1641 Died)
Juan Ruiz de Colmenero (25 Jun 1646 – 28 Sep 1663 Died)
Francisco Verdín y Molina (6 Jul 1665 – 27 Nov 1673, Appointed Bishop of Michoacán)
Manuel Fernández de Santa Cruz y Sahagún (19 Feb 1674 – 19 Oct 1676 Confirmed, Bishop of Tlaxcala (Puebla de los Ángeles))
Juan de Santiago y León Garabito (13 Sep 1677 – 12 Jul 1694 Died)
Felipe Galindo Chávez y Pineda, O.P. (30 May 1695 – 7 Mar 1702 Died)
Diego Camacho y Ávila (14 Jan 1704 – 19 Oct 1712 Died)
Manuel de Mimbela y Morlans, O.F.M. (26 Feb 1714 – 4 May 1721 Died)
Pedro de Tapiz y Garcia (23 Sep 1722 Appointed – Did Not Take Effect)
Juan Bautista Alvarez de Toledo, O.F.M. (30 Aug 1723 – 1 Jul 1725 Died)
Nicolás Carlos Gómez de Cervantes y Velázquez de la Cadena (20 Feb 1726 – 6 Nov 1734 Died)
Juan Leandro Gómez de Parada Valdez y Mendoza (2 Dec 1735 – 14 Jan 1751 Died)
José Francisco Martínez de Tejada y Díez de Velasco, O.F.M. (20 Dec 1751 – 20 Dec 1760 Died)
Diego Rodríguez de Rivas y Velasco (29 Mar 1762 – 11 Dec 1770 Died)
Antonio Alcalde y Barriga, O.P. (27 Jan 1772 – 7 Aug 1792 Died)
Esteban Lorenzo de Tristán y Esmenota (17 Jun 1793 – 10 Dec 1794 Died)
Juan Cruz Ruiz de Cabañas y Crespo (18 Dec 1795 – 28 Nov 1824 Died)
José Miguel Gordoa y Barrios (19 Oct 1830 – 12 Jul 1832 Died)
Diego de Aranda y Carpinteiro (11 Jul 1836 – 17 Mar 1853 Died)

Archdiocese of Guadalajara
Elevated: 26 January 1863
Pedro Espinosa y Dávalos  (12 Sep 1853 – 12 Nov 1866)
Pedro José de Jesús Loza y Pardavé (22 Jun 1868 – 15 Nov 1898)
Jacinto López y Romo (19 Aug 1899 – 31 Dec 1900)
José de Jesús Ortíz y Rodríguez (16 Sep 1901 – 19 Jun 1912 )
José Francisco Orozco y Jiménez (2 Dec 1912 – 18 Feb 1936)
José Garibi y Rivera (18 Feb 1936 – 1 Mar 1969); elevated to Cardinal in 1958
José Salazar López (21 Feb 1970 – 15 May 1987); elevated to Cardinal in 1973
Juan Jesús Posadas Ocampo  (15 May 1987 – 24 May 1993); elevated to Cardinal in 1991
Juan Sandoval Íñiguez (21 Apr 1994 – 7 Dec 2011); elevated to Cardinal in 1994
Francisco Robles Ortega (7 Dec 2011 – ); elevated to Cardinal in 2007

Coadjutor bishops
José Garibi y Rivera (1934–1936); future Cardinal
Francisco Javier Nuño y Guerrero (1954–1972); did not succeed to see; appointed Archbishop (personal title) of San Juan de los Lagos, Jalisco

Auxiliary bishops
Ignacio Mateo Guerra y Alba (1862–1863), appointed Bishop of Zacatecas
Francisco Uranga y Sáenz (1919–1922), appointed Bishop of Cuernavaca, Morelos
Rafael Garcia González (1972–1974), appointed Bishop of Tabasco
Antonio Sahagún López (1973–1992)
Adolfo Hernández Hurtado (1974–1997)
Ramón Godinez Flores (1980–1998), appointed Bishop of Aguascalientes
José Guadalupe Martín Rábago (1992–1995)
Javier Navarro Rodríguez (1992–1999), appointed Bishop of San Juan de los Lagos, Jalisco
José Luis Chávez Botello (1997–2001), appointed Bishop of Tuxtla Gutiérrez, Chiapas
José Trinidad González Rodríguez (1997–2015)
José Benjamín Castillo Plascencia (1999–2003), appointed Bishop of Tabasco
Miguel Romano Gómez (2000–2014)
José María de la Torre Martín (2002–2008), appointed Bishop of Aguascalientes
Rafael Francisco Martínez Sáinz (2002–2012)
José Leopoldo González González (2005–2015), appointed Bishop of Nogales, Sonora
José Francisco González González (2008–2013), appointed Bishop of Campeche
Juan Humberto Gutiérrez Valencia (2008–2018)
Héctor López Alvarado (2018–
Juan Manuel Muñoz Curiel, O.F.M. (2018–
Engelberto Polino Sánchez (2018–

Other priests of this diocese who became bishops
Rafael Sabás Camacho y García, appointed Bishop of Querétaro in 1885
Jaime Anesagasti y Llamas, appointed Bishop of Campeche in 1909
Miguel María de la Mora y Mora, appointed Bishop of Zacatecas in 1911
Manuel Azpeitia Palomar, appointed Bishop of Tepic, Nayarit in 1919
Silviano Carrillo y Cárdenas, appointed Bishop of Sinaloa in 1920
José de Jesús López y González, appointed Auxiliary Bishop of Aguascalientes in 1927
Ignacio de Alba y Hernández, appointed Coadjutor Bishop of Colima in 1939
Alfonso Tóriz Cobián, appointed Coadjutor Bishop of Chilapa, Guerrero in 1954
Miguel González Ibarra, appointed Bishop of Autlán, Jalisco in 1961
Carlos Quintero Arce, appointed Bishop of Ciudad Valles, San Luís Potosí in 1961
José Guadalupe Padilla Lozano, appointed Bishop of Veracruz in 1963
José Trinidad Sepúlveda Ruiz-Velasco, appointed Bishop of Tuxtla Gutiérrez, Chiapas in 1965
José Refugio Mercado Díaz, appointed Auxiliary Bishop of Tehuantepec, Oaxaca in 2003
Marcelino Hernández Rodríguez, appointed Auxiliary Bishop of México, Federal District in 2008
Felipe Salazar Villagrana, appointed Bishop of San Juan de los Lagos, Jalisco in 2008

See also
List of Roman Catholic archdioceses in México

References

External links
Archdiocese of Guadalajara website

Roman Catholic dioceses in Mexico
Guadalajara, Jalisco
Religious organizations established in the 1540s
1548 establishments in New Spain

Roman Catholic dioceses established in the 16th century
Roman Catholic ecclesiastical provinces in Mexico
A